The 1982 CFL season is considered to be the 29th season in modern-day Canadian football, although it is officially the 25th Canadian Football League season.

CFL News in 1982
After the 1981 season, the Montreal Alouettes folded. However, one day later in 1982 the CFL granted the city of Montreal a new franchise called the Concordes, which assumed the Alouettes' history and player contracts.

The 1982 Grey Cup game between the Edmonton Eskimos and the Toronto Argonauts attracted 7,862,000 television viewers, the largest television audience in the history of Canadian television.

NBC broadcast four CFL games in the United States over three weeks during the 1982 NFL players' strike.

The Edmonton Eskimos won their fifth straight Grey Cup championship.

Regular season standings

Final regular season standings
Note: GP = Games Played, W = Wins, L = Losses, T = Ties, PF = Points For, PA = Points Against, Pts = Points

Bold text means that they had clinched the playoffs.
Edmonton and Toronto had first round byes.

Grey Cup playoffs

The Edmonton Eskimos were the 1982 Grey Cup champions, defeating the Toronto Argonauts, 32–16, in front of their home crowd at Toronto's Exhibition Stadium. That was Edmonton's fifth-straight championship, becoming the CFL's most successful dynasty. The Eskimos' Warren Moon (QB) was named the Grey Cup's Most Valuable Player on Offence and Dave "Dr. Death" Fennell (DT) was named the Grey Cup's Most Valuable Player on Defence and was the Grey Cup's Most Valuable Canadian.

Playoff bracket

CFL Leaders
 CFL Passing Leaders
 CFL Rushing Leaders
 CFL Receiving Leaders

1982 CFL All-Stars

Offence
QB – Warren Moon, Edmonton Eskimos
RB – Alvin "Skip" Walker, Ottawa Rough Riders
RB – William Miller, Winnipeg Blue Bombers
SB – Tom Scott, Edmonton Eskimos
SB – Joey Walters, Saskatchewan Roughriders
WR – Terry Greer, Toronto Argonauts
WR – Keith Baker, Hamilton Tiger-Cats
C – John Bonk, Winnipeg Blue Bombers
OG – Val Belcher, Ottawa Rough Riders
OG – Rudy Phillips, Ottawa Rough Riders
OT – Bobby Thompson, Winnipeg Blue Bombers
OT – Lloyd Fairbanks, Calgary Stampeders

Defence
DT – Mike Samples, Saskatchewan Roughriders
DT – John Helton, Winnipeg Blue Bombers
DE – Nick Hebeler, BC Lions
DE – Pete Catan, Winnipeg Blue Bombers
LB – Danny Bass, Calgary Stampeders
LB – James "Quick" Parker, Edmonton Eskimos
LB – Ben Zambiasi, Hamilton Tiger-Cats
DB – David Shaw, Hamilton Tiger-Cats
DB – Ray Odums, Calgary Stampeders
DB – Vince Phason, Winnipeg Blue Bombers
DB – Fran McDermott, Saskatchewan Roughriders
DB – Zac Henderson, Toronto Argonauts

Special teams
P – Ken Clark, Saskatchewan Roughriders
K – Dave Ridgway, Saskatchewan Roughriders

1982 Western All-Stars

Offence
QB – Dieter Brock, Winnipeg Blue Bombers
RB – James Sykes, Calgary Stampeders
RB – William Miller, Winnipeg Blue Bombers
SB – Tom Scott, Edmonton Eskimos
SB – Joey Walters, Saskatchewan Roughriders
WR – Mervyn Fernandez, BC Lions
WR – Willie Armstead, Calgary Stampeders
C – John Bonk, Winnipeg Blue Bombers
OG – Nick Bastaja, Winnipeg Blue Bombers
OG – Leo Blanchard, Edmonton Eskimos
OG – Roger Aldag, Saskatchewan Roughriders
OT – Bobby Thompson, Winnipeg Blue Bombers
OT – Lloyd Fairbanks, Calgary Stampeders

Defence
DT – Mike Samples, Saskatchewan Roughriders
DT – John Helton, Winnipeg Blue Bombers
DE – Nick Hebeler, BC Lions
DE – Pete Catan, Winnipeg Blue Bombers
LB – Danny Bass, Calgary Stampeders
LB – James "Quick" Parker, Edmonton Eskimos
LB – Glen Jackson, BC Lions
DB – Joe Hollimon, Edmonton Eskimos
DB – Ray Odums, Calgary Stampeders
DB – Vince Phason, Winnipeg Blue Bombers
DB – Fran McDermott, Saskatchewan Roughriders
DB – Paul Bennett, Winnipeg Blue Bombers

Special teams
P – Ken Clark, Saskatchewan Roughriders
K – Dave Ridgway, Saskatchewan Roughriders

1982 Eastern All-Stars

Offence
QB – Condredge Holloway, Toronto Argonauts
RB – Alvin "Skip" Walker, Ottawa Rough Riders
RB – Cedric Minter, Toronto Argonauts
SB – Rocky DiPietro, Hamilton Tiger-Cats
SB – Nick Arakgi, Montreal Concordes
WR – Terry Greer, Toronto Argonauts
WR – Keith Baker, Hamilton Tiger-Cats
C – Henry Waszczuk, Hamilton Tiger-Cats
OG – Val Belcher, Ottawa Rough Riders
OG – Rudy Phillips, Ottawa Rough Riders
OT – Ed Fulton, Hamilton Tiger-Cats
OT – Doug Payton, Montreal Concordes

Defence
DT – Gary Dulin, Ottawa Rough Riders
DT – Glen Weir, Montreal Concordes
DE – Doug Scott, Montreal Concordes
DE – Greg Marshall, Ottawa Rough Riders
LB – John Pointer, Toronto Argonauts
LB – William Hampton, Montreal Concordes
LB – Ben Zambiasi, Hamilton Tiger-Cats
DB – David Shaw, Hamilton Tiger-Cats
DB – Carl Brazley, Ottawa Rough Riders
DB – Howard Fields, Hamilton Tiger-Cats
DB – Mark Young, Montreal Concordes
DB – Zac Henderson, Toronto Argonauts

Special teams
P – Bernie Ruoff, Hamilton Tiger-Cats
K – Gerry Organ, Ottawa Rough Riders

1982 CFL Awards
CFL's Most Outstanding Player Award – Condredge Holloway (QB), Toronto Argonauts
CFL's Most Outstanding Canadian Award – Rocky DiPietro (SB), Hamilton Tiger-Cats
CFL's Most Outstanding Defensive Player Award – James "Quick" Parker (LB), Edmonton Eskimos
CFL's Most Outstanding Offensive Lineman Award – Rudy Phillips (OG), Ottawa Rough Riders
CFL's Most Outstanding Rookie Award – Chris Isaac (QB), Ottawa Rough Riders
CFLPA's Outstanding Community Service Award – David Boone (DE), Edmonton Eskimos
CFL's Coach of the Year – Bob O'Billovich, Toronto Argonauts

References

CFL
Canadian Football League seasons